Philidris is a genus of ants in the subfamily Dolichoderinae. The genus is known from tropical forests from eastern India to northern Australia. It is similar to the genus Iridomyrmex, from where the type species was transferred from by Shattuck (1992).

Species
Philidris brunnea (Donisthorpe, 1949)
Philidris cordata (Smith, 1859)
Philidris cruda (Smith, 1860)
Philidris jiugongshanensis Wang & Wu, 2007
Philidris laevigata (Emery, 1895)
Philidris myrmecodiae (Emery, 1887)
Philidris nagasau (Mann, 1921)
Philidris notiala Zhou & Zheng, 1998
Philidris pubescens (Donisthorpe, 1949)

References

External links

 Phildris on AntWiki

Dolichoderinae
Ant genera
Hymenoptera of Asia
Hymenoptera of Australia